Carn Dearg (Gaelic for red cairn) is the name of several mountains in Scotland:

 Càrn Dearg, a  peak NW of Ben Nevis
 Càrn Dearg (Ben Alder), a  Munro north of Ben Alder
 Càrn Dearg, a  peak SW of Ben Nevis
 Càrn Dearg (Monadh Liath), a  Munro, the highest point in the Monadh Liath
 Càrn Dearg (Corrour), a  Munro southeast of Loch Ossian
 Càrn Dearg (East of Glen Roy), an  Corbett east of Glen Roy
 Càrn Dearg (North of Gleann Eachach), an  Corbett north of Gleann Eachach, and north of Glen Roy
 Càrn Dearg (South of Gleann Eachach), a  Corbett south of Gleann Eachach, and north of Glen Roy
 Càrn Dearg (Oban), a  Marilyn near Oban

See also
Càrn Dearg Mòr
Càrn Mòr Dearg